Adam Wingard (born December 3, 1982) is an American filmmaker. He has served as a director, producer, screenwriter, editor, cinematographer, actor, and composer on numerous projects. 

Following an early career as a member of the mumblecore movement, he became notable for his works in the horror and action genres, especially the films You're Next (2011), and The Guest (2014), and the bigger budget franchise films Blair Witch (2016), Death Note (2017), and Godzilla vs. Kong (2021).

Life and career
Wingard was born in Oak Ridge, Tennessee and graduated from Full Sail University in 2002. 
His first feature, the horror comedy Home Sick, starring Bill Moseley and Tiffany Shepis, was a stepping stone to his second feature, the psychotropic ghost story horror film Pop Skull. Made on a total budget of $2,000, Pop Skull had its international premiere at the Rome Film Festival and its domestic premiere at the AFI Film Festival in 2007. A Horrible Way to Die (2010) and What Fun We Were Having (2011) followed.

The romantic horror film A Horrible Way to Die premiered at the 2010 Toronto International Film Festival in the ‘Vanguard’ section and was acquired by Starz/Anchor Bay at the festival for a North American theatrical and home media release. What Fun We Were Having: 4 Stories About Date Rape is a 4-part anthology that had its premiere at the 2011 Fantastia Film Festival in Montreal where Wingard was honored by the festival with his own sidebar section: “Medicated Monsters – A Spotlight on Filmmaker Adam Wingard”.

In 2011, Wingard co-directed Autoerotic with mumblecore icon (and frequent actor in Wingard films) Joe Swanberg. He was selected to direct one chapter of The ABCs of Death, a 26-chapter horror comedy anthology for Drafthouse Films and Magnet. A solo directorial effort, You're Next, a home invasion slasher, premiered at the 2011 Toronto International Film Festival as part of the ‘Midnight Madness’ section. The film was acquired by Lionsgate and received a wide release in August 2013 to generally favorable reviews.

In 2014, Wingard directed The Guest starring Dan Stevens, which premiered at the Sundance Film Festival, the Toronto International Film Festival and Fantastic Fest, receiving wide critical acclaim upon its wider theatrical release in mid-September. Wingard directed the found-footage horror film Blair Witch, based on a script by Simon Barrett. The film is a sequel to the 1999 The Blair Witch Project and received mixed reviews.

In 2015, Wingard signed on to direct a live action American film adaptation of Tsugumi Ohba and Takeshi Obata's popular horror crime-thriller manga series Death Note. The neo-noir dark fantasy horror-thriller was released on Netflix on August 25, 2017, to a mixed reception, with criticism aimed at the number of changes from the source material, rushed plot, shallow execution, writing and pacing- while praise was aimed at the visual style, direction, performances of the cast, soundtrack and the dark, macabre sense of humour, along with the attempted unique and distinctive take on the Death Note mythos.

In May 2017, Wingard was announced as the director for Godzilla vs. Kong, which was released in March 2021. In February 2021, it was announced that Wingard would direct and co-write, with Simon Barrett, a sequel to Face/Off. In March 2021, Wingard was announced as the director of ThunderCats, also co-writing it with Barrett. In May 2021, it was announced that Wingard would direct an adaptation of the comic Hardcore by Robert Kirkman. Wingard will also write the screenplay with Will Simmons from a story by Kirkman.

In April 2021, The Hollywood Reporter stated that Legendary was "quietly taking steps" to stretch the MonsterVerse into "one or more installments," while negotiating with Wingard to potentially return to direct. Various ideas were being considered, with Son of Kong being one potential title. In May 2022, it was reported that Wingard would return to direct a sequel to Godzilla vs. Kong.

Awards and nominations
Wingard's film Pop Skull won the Best Feature Film award at the Indianapolis International Film Festival and the Jury award at the Boston Underground Film Festival. Wingard's A Horrible Way to Die won Best Screenplay (Simon Barrett), Best Actor (A.J. Bowen) and Best Actress (Amy Seimetz) at the 2010 Fantastic Fest in Austin, Texas. Wingard's You're Next won Best Picture, Best Director, Best Screenplay (Simon Barrett), and Best Actress (Sharni Vinson) at the 2011 Fantastic Fest in Austin, Texas.

Filmography

Acting roles

Television

Short films

References

External links 
 
 
 Twitch Interview with Adam Wingard
 Lumiere Reader Interview
 Fatally Yours Interview with Adam Wingard

1982 births
Living people
21st-century American composers
21st-century American screenwriters
People from Oak Ridge, Tennessee
American film editors
American cinematographers
English-language film directors
Film directors from Tennessee
Full Sail University alumni
Horror film directors
Screenwriters from Tennessee
Film producers from Tennessee
American film score composers